Bracon mellitor is a species of braconid wasp in the family Braconidae. They are found in North America from South Dakota and Texas to the east. They feed on Coleoptera and Lepidoptera.

References

Braconinae
Articles created by Qbugbot
Insects described in 1836